Procercocebus is a genus of prehistoric baboons closely resembling the forest dwelling mangabeys.

References

External links
Mikko's Phylogeny Archive
Proctor, Darby. Taxon, Site and Temporal Differentiation Using Dental Microwear in the Southern African Papionins. M.A. Thesis. Georgia State University, 2007. 

Pleistocene primates
Prehistoric monkeys
Papionini
Cenozoic mammals of Africa
Prehistoric primate genera
Fossil taxa described in 2007